Michele Benzi (born 1962  in Bologna) is an Italian mathematician who works as a full professor in the Scuola Normale Superiore in Pisa. He is known for his contributions to numerical linear algebra and its applications, especially to the solution of sparse linear systems and the study of preconditioners.

Previous career 

He worked as assistant professor at the University of Bologna from 1993 to 1996, then at Cerfacs in Toulouse from 1996 to 1997, and then at the Los Alamos National Laboratory for three years.

He transferred to the Emory University in Atlanta in 2000, where he held the endowed chair of Samuel Candler Dobbs professor starting from 2012 to 2018. Subsequently he moved back to Italy to the Scuola Normale Superiore in Pisa as a full professor.

Awards 

Benzi was named a SIAM Fellow in 2012, and a fellow of the American Mathematical Society in 2018 "for his contributions in numerical linear algebra, exposition, and service to the profession". As of 2022, he is the editor in chief of the SIAM Journal on Matrix Analysis and Applications, and he is editor of approximately 20 journals. He won a SIAM Outstanding Paper Prize in 2001.

Selected publications 

 Numerical solution of saddle point problems. M Benzi, GH Golub, J Liesen. Acta Numerica 14, 1-137
 Preconditioning techniques for large linear systems: a survey. M Benzi. Journal of Computational Physics 182 (2), 418-477
 A preconditioner for generalized saddle point problems. M Benzi, GH Golub. SIAM Journal on Matrix Analysis and Applications 26 (1), 20-41
 The physics of communicability in complex networks. E Estrada, N Hatano, M Benzi. Physics Reports 514 (3), 89-119

References 

 Italian mathematicians
1962 births
Living people